Mary Zophres is an American costume designer who has worked in the film industry since 1994. She has been nominated for the Academy Award for Best Costume Design four times for True Grit (2010), La La Land (2016), The Ballad of Buster Scruggs (2018), and Babylon (2022). She has also been nominated for the BAFTA Award for Best Costume Design five times for Catch Me If You Can (2002), True Grit, La La Land, The Ballad of Buster Scruggs, and Babylon.

Background
Zophres was born in Ft. Lauderdale, Florida. She has Greek roots, with her father having been born in Ioannina. She attended Vassar College in Poughkeepsie, New York, and she graduated with degrees in art history and studio art. Zophres worked in the fashion industry for Norma Kamali and Esprit. 

She was hired as the extras wardrobe supervisor for Oliver Stone's 1989 film Born on the Fourth of July, working under costume designer Judy Ruskin. She subsequently worked as associate costume designer for Ruskin for three more films, including the 1991 film City Slickers. Zophres moved to Los Angeles and worked for designer Richard Hornung on three films, including the 1994 film The Hudsucker Proxy by the Coen brothers. When Hornung was too sick to work on the Coens' 1996 film Fargo, Zophres took over. She subsequently had a creative partnership with the Coen brothers on all of their subsequent films and has also worked on a variety of other films.

Filmography

Awards and nominations

References

External links 
 

American costume designers
Women costume designers
Living people
People from Fort Lauderdale, Florida
American people of Greek descent
Vassar College alumni
Year of birth missing (living people)